Prentiss County is a county located in the U.S. state of Mississippi. As of the 2020 census, the population was 25,008. Its county seat is Booneville. The county is named for Seargent Smith Prentiss, a noted speaker and US Congressman from Natchez. (Seargent was his first name, not a military title.)

Geography

Major highways
  U.S. Highway 45
  Mississippi Highway 4
  Mississippi Highway 30
  Mississippi Highway 145

Adjacent counties
 Alcorn County (north)
 Tishomingo County (east)
 Itawamba County (southeast)
 Lee County (southwest)
 Union County (west)
 Tippah County (northwest)

National protected area
 Natchez Trace Parkway (part)

Demographics

2020 census

As of the 2020 United States Census, there were 25,008 people, 9,145 households, and 6,092 families residing in the county.

2000 census
As of the census of 2000, there were 25,556 people, 9,821 households, and 7,169 families living in the county.  The population density was 62 people per square mile (24/km2).  There were 10,681 housing units at an average density of 26 per square mile (10/km2).  The racial makeup of the county was 85.85% White, 12.94% Black or African American, 0.18% Native American, 0.16% Asian, 0.17% from other races, and 0.70% from two or more races.  0.69% of the population were Hispanic or Latino of any race.

In 2000 there were 9,821 households, out of which 33.70% had children under the age of 18 living with them, 56.30% were married couples living together, 12.60% had a female householder with no husband present, and 27.00% were non-families. 24.90% of all households were made up of individuals, and 12.00% had someone living alone who was 65 years of age or older.  The average household size was 2.52 and the average family size was 3.00.

In the county, the population was spread out, with 25.00% under the age of 18, 11.60% from 18 to 24, 27.10% from 25 to 44, 22.40% from 45 to 64, and 13.90% who were 65 years of age or older.  The median age was 35 years. For every 100 females there were 94.10 males.  For every 100 females age 18 and over, there were 89.40 males.

The median income for a household in the county was $28,446, and the median income for a family was $35,125. Males had a median income of $26,862 versus $19,766 for females. The per capita income for the county was $14,131.  About 13.10% of families and 16.50% of the population were below the poverty line, including 18.60% of those under age 18 and 22.40% of those age 65 or over.

Communities

Cities
 Baldwyn (partly in Lee County)
 Booneville (county seat)

Towns
 Jumpertown
 Marietta

Census-designated places
 New Site
 Wheeler

Unincorporated communities
 Altitude
 Blackland
 Cairo
 Hills Chapel
 Hobo Station
 Osborne Creek
 Thrasher

Politics

See also
 Moist county
 National Register of Historic Places listings in Prentiss County, Mississippi
 Jacinto, historic county seat of Prentiss' parent county, Old Tishomingo County, Mississippi

References

External links
 Prentiss County Voice

 
Mississippi counties
Counties of Appalachia
1870 establishments in Mississippi
Populated places established in 1870